Alejandro Arango y Escandón ( – ) was a Mexican author. 

He was educated in Madrid and Paris, and filled several high offices, but declined to accept any compensation for his public services. His library was one of the richest in Mexico. A volume of poems and the Ensayo historico sobre Fray Luis de Leon are among his best works. The latter won him membership in both the Royal Spanish Academy and the academy of history of Spain. Alejandro Arango y Escandón died on 28 February 1883 in Mexico City.

References 

Created via preloaddraft
1821 births
1883 deaths